Plarasa or Plarassa was an inland town of ancient Caria, inhabited during Roman times. At some point it, along with Tauropolis, became part of the territory of the Antiochia ad Maeandrum, after which an aqueduct which was built by Marcus Ulpius Carminius Claudianus (husband of Carminia Ammia) in the 2nd century to supply the combined community.

Its site is located near Bingeç in Asiatic Turkey.

References

Populated places in ancient Caria
Former populated places in Turkey
Roman towns and cities in Turkey
History of Aydın Province
Karacasu District